The Little Ferry Public Schools is a community public school district that serves students in kindergarten through eighth grade from Little Ferry in Bergen County, New Jersey, United States.

As of the 2018–19 school year, the district, comprising two schools, had an enrollment of 900 students and 78.6 classroom teachers (on an FTE basis), for a student–teacher ratio of 11.5:1.

The district is classified by the New Jersey Department of Education as being in District Factor Group "CD", the sixth-highest of eight groupings. District Factor Groups organize districts statewide to allow comparison by common socioeconomic characteristics of the local districts. From lowest socioeconomic status to highest, the categories are A, B, CD, DE, FG, GH, I and J.

Since Little Ferry does not have its own high school, public school students from the borough attend Ridgefield Park High School in Ridgefield Park for ninth through twelfth grades as part of a sending/receiving relationship with the Ridgefield Park Public Schools that has been in place since 1953. As of the 2018–19 school year, the high school had an enrollment of 1,196 students and 89.0 classroom teachers (on an FTE basis), for a student–teacher ratio of 13.4:1.

Awards and recognition
Memorial School was recognized by Governor Jim McGreevey in 2003 as one of 25 schools selected statewide for the First Annual Governor's School of Excellence award.

Schools 
The district operates two school facilities, across the street from each other. Schools in the district (with 2018–19 enrollment data from the National Center for Education Statistics) are:
Washington Elementary School with 466 students in grades PreK-4
Tonilyn Peragallo, Principal
Memorial Middle School with 401 students in grades 5-8
Robert Porfido, Principal

Administration 
Core members of the district's administration are:
Frank R. Scarafile, Superintendent of Schools
Tina Trueba, Board Secretary / Business Administrator

Board of education
The district's board of education, with nine members, sets policy and oversees the fiscal and educational operation of the district through its administration. As a Type II school district, the board's trustees are elected directly by voters to serve three-year terms of office on a staggered basis, with three seats up for election each year held (since 2012) as part of the November general election.

References

External links 
Little Ferry Public Schools

School Data for the Little Ferry Public Schools, National Center for Education Statistics
Ridgefield Park High School

Little Ferry, New Jersey
New Jersey District Factor Group CD
School districts in Bergen County, New Jersey